Combretum, the bushwillows or combretums, make up the type genus of the family Combretaceae. The genus comprises about 272 species of trees and shrubs, most of which are native to tropical and southern Africa, about 5 to Madagascar, but there are others that are native to tropical Asia, New Guinea and the Bismarck Archipelago, Australia, and tropical America. Though somewhat reminiscent of willows (Salix) in their habitus, they are not particularly close relatives of these.

Ecology

Bushwillow trees often are important plants in their habitat. Savannahs in Africa, in particular those growing on granitic soils, are often dominated by Combretum and its close relative Terminalia. For example, C. apiculatum is a notable tree in the Angolan mopane woodlands ecoregion in the Kunene River basin in southern Africa.

Other species of this genus are a major component of Southwestern Amazonian moist forests. This genus contains several species that are pollinated by mammals other than bats, which is quite rare indeed. But most species are more conventionally pollinated by insects or birds.

Typhlodromus combretum, a mite of the family Phytoseiidae, was discovered on a bushwillow plant and is named after this genus. Other herbivores that eat Combretum foliage include the caterpillars of the Brown Awl (Badamia exclamationis) which is found on C. albidum, C. latifolium and C. ovalifolium; those of the Orange-tailed Awl (Bibasis sena) are recorded from C. extensum and C. latifolium.

Use by humans

Several species are used in African or Indian herbal medicine. The class of chemical compounds known as combretastatins were first isolated from South African Bushwillow (Combretum caffrum), from which they get their name.  One synthetic derivative, fosbretabulin disodium (combretastatin A4 phosphate), underwent preliminary study for the treatment of anaplastic thyroid cancer, but it was not effective enough to progress to more advanced trials.  C. molle is also recorded to contain antioxidants such as punicalagin, which is also found in pomegranates (Punica granatum), a somewhat related plant.

The botanist George Don studied this genus extensively. The Luvuvhu River in southern Africa was named after the river's bushwillows (C. erythrophyllum), locally known as muvuvhu.

Species
As of April 2021, there are 272 accepted species of Combretum:

Combretum aculeatum 
Combretum acuminatum 
Combretum acutifolium 
Combretum acutum 
Combretum adenogonium 
Combretum adrianii 
Combretum afzelii 
Combretum alatum 
Combretum albiflorum 
Combretum albopunctatum 
Combretum alfredi 
Combretum andongense 
Combretum andradae 
Combretum angolense 
Combretum angustipetalum 
Combretum annulatum 
Combretum apetalum 
Combretum aphanopetalum 
Combretum apiculatum 
Combretum argenteum 
Combretum argyrotrichum 
Combretum assimile 
Combretum atropurpureum 
Combretum aureonitens 
Combretum auriculatum 
Combretum barbatum 
Combretum batesii 
Combretum bauchiense 
Combretum baumii 
Combretum bipindense 
Combretum blepharopetalum 
Combretum boinensis 
Combretum bracteatum 
Combretum bracteosum 
Combretum brassiciforme 
Combretum brevistylum 
Combretum brunneum 
Combretum butyrosum 
Combretum cacoucia 
Combretum caffrum 
Combretum camporum 
Combretum capitatum 
Combretum capituliflorum 
Combretum capuronii 
Combretum carringtonianum 
Combretum caudatisepalum 
Combretum celastroides 
Combretum chinense 
Combretum chionanthoides 
Combretum cinereopetalum 
Combretum cinnabarinum 
Combretum clarense 
Combretum coccineum 
Combretum collinum 
Combretum comosum 
Combretum conchipetalum 
Combretum confertum 
Combretum × confusum 
Combretum congolanum 
Combretum constrictum 
Combretum contractum 
Combretum coriifolium 
Combretum coursianum 
Combretum cuspidatum 
Combretum decandrum 
Combretum decaryi 
Combretum deciduum 
Combretum demeusei 
Combretum discolor 
Combretum dolichopodum 
Combretum duarteanum 
Combretum echirense 
Combretum edwardsii 
Combretum elaeagnoides 
Combretum engleri 
Combretum eriogynum 
Combretum erosum 
Combretum erythrophloeum 
Combretum erythrophyllum 
Combretum esteriense 
Combretum evisceratum 
Combretum exalatum 
Combretum exannulatum 
Combretum excelsum 
Combretum exellii 
Combretum falcatum 
Combretum farinosum 
Combretum flammeum 
Combretum foliatum 
Combretum frangulifolium 
Combretum fruticosum 
Combretum fulvum 
Combretum fuscum 
Combretum gabonense 
Combretum germainii 
Combretum ghesquierei 
Combretum gillettianum 
Combretum glabrum 
Combretum glaucocarpum 
Combretum glutinosum 
Combretum goetzei 
Combretum goldieanum 
Combretum goossensii 
Combretum gordonii 
Combretum gossweileri 
Combretum gracile 
Combretum graciliflorum 
Combretum grandidieri 
Combretum grandiflorum 
Combretum griffithii 
Combretum harmsianum 
Combretum harrisii 
Combretum hartmannianum 
Combretum haullevilleanum 
Combretum hensii 
Combretum hereroense 
Combretum hilarianum 
Combretum holstii 
Combretum homalioides 
Combretum igneiflorum 
Combretum illairii 
Combretum imberbe 
Combretum indicum 
Combretum inflatum 
Combretum ivanii 
Combretum kasaiense 
Combretum kirkii 
Combretum klossii 
Combretum klotzschii 
Combretum kostermansii 
Combretum kraussii 
Combretum lanceolatum 
Combretum lanuginosum 
Combretum latialatum 
Combretum latifolium 
Combretum laxum 
Combretum lecardii 
Combretum leprosum 
Combretum lindense 
Combretum lisowskii 
Combretum littoreum 
Combretum llewelynii 
Combretum lokele 
Combretum longicollum 
Combretum longipilosum 
Combretum longispicatum 
Combretum longistipitatum 
Combretum louisii 
Combretum lukafuensis 
Combretum luxenii 
Combretum macrocalyx 
Combretum malabaricum 
Combretum mannii 
Combretum marginatum 
Combretum marquesii 
Combretum mellifluum 
Combretum meridionalis 
Combretum micranthum 
Combretum microphyllum 
Combretum mkuzense 
Combretum moggii 
Combretum molle 
Combretum monetaria 
Combretum mooreanum 
Combretum mortehanii 
Combretum mossambicense 
Combretum mucronatum 
Combretum multinervium 
Combretum mussaendiflorum 
Combretum mweroense 
Combretum nanum 
Combretum ndjoleense 
Combretum nigrescens 
Combretum nigricans 
Combretum nioroense 
Combretum niphophilum 
Combretum nusbaumeri 
Combretum oatesii 
Combretum obovatum 
Combretum obscurum 
Combretum octagonum 
Combretum olivaceum 
Combretum oudenhovenii 
Combretum ovalifolium 
Combretum oxygonium 
Combretum oxystachyum 
Combretum oyemense 
Combretum padoides 
Combretum paniculatum 
Combretum paradoxum 
Combretum paraguariense 
Combretum patelliforme 
Combretum paucinervium 
Combretum pavonii 
Combretum pecoense 
Combretum pellegrinianum 
Combretum pentagonum 
Combretum petrophilum 
Combretum phaeocarpum 
Combretum pilosum 
Combretum pisoniiflorum 
Combretum pisonioides 
Combretum platypterum 
Combretum polyanthum 
Combretum polystictum 
Combretum procursum 
Combretum psidioides 
Combretum punctatum 
Combretum purpureiflorum 
Combretum pyramidatum 
Combretum pyrifolium 
Combretum quadrangulare 
Combretum quadratum 
Combretum rabiense 
Combretum racemosum 
Combretum razianum 
Combretum recurvatum 
Combretum relictum 
Combretum rhodanthum 
Combretum riggenbachianum 
Combretum robustum 
Combretum robynsii 
Combretum rochetianum 
Combretum rohrii 
Combretum rotundifolium 
Combretum rovirosae 
Combretum roxburghii 
Combretum rupestre 
Combretum rupicola 
Combretum sanjappae 
Combretum scandens 
Combretum schumannii 
Combretum sericeum 
Combretum shivannae 
Combretum sordidum 
Combretum sphaeroides 
Combretum spinosum 
Combretum stenopterum 
Combretum stocksii 
Combretum struempellianum 
Combretum stylesii 
Combretum subglabratum 
Combretum subumbellatum 
Combretum sundaicum 
Combretum sylvicola 
Combretum tarquense 
Combretum tenuipetiolatum 
Combretum tessmannii 
Combretum tetragonocarpum 
Combretum tetralophoides 
Combretum tetralophum 
Combretum teuschii 
Combretum tibatiense 
Combretum tomentosum 
Combretum towaense 
Combretum trichophyllum 
Combretum trifoliatum 
Combretum ulei 
Combretum umbricola 
Combretum vendae 
Combretum vernicosum 
Combretum villosum 
Combretum violaceum 
Combretum virgatum 
Combretum viscosum 
Combretum wallichii 
Combretum wattii 
Combretum wilksii 
Combretum winitii 
Combretum xanthothyrsum 
Combretum youngii 
Combretum zenkeri 
Combretum zeyheri

References

External links

 
Medicinal plants
Myrtales genera